This is a list of military installations in Saudi Arabia.

Joint 
 King Khalid Military City

Air Force 
 King Abdulaziz Air Base
 King Abdullah Air Base
 King Faisal Air Base
 King Fahad Air Base
 King Salman Air Base
 King Saud Air Base
 Prince Sultan Air Base

Medical 
 King Abdulaziz Medical City
 Riyadh Military Hospital

Navy 
 King Abdulaziz Naval Base
 King Faisal Naval Base

Strategic 
 Al Sulayyil ballistic missile base
 Al-Watah ballistic missile base

Foreign forces 
 Eskan Village Air Force Base in Riyadh

See also 

 Lists of military installations

References 

 
Saudi
Installationd
Military